The 2008 Big 12 Conference baseball tournament was held at AT&T Bricktown Ballpark in Oklahoma City, OK from May 21 to May 25, 2008. This was the third year the conference uses the round robin tournament setup. The winners of each group at the end of the round robin face each other in a one-game match for the championship.

Regular Season Standings
Source:

Colorado and Iowa State did not sponsor baseball teams.

Tournament

Texas Tech and Kansas did not make the tournament.
Texas wins tiebreaker over Oklahoma by virtue of their 11–10 head to head win
* 10 innings
Kansas State wins tiebreaker over Oklahoma State by virtue of their 3–2 head to head win

All-Tournament Team

See also
College World Series
NCAA Division I Baseball Championship
Big 12 Conference baseball tournament

References

Big 12 Tourney Results
Big 12 Standings

Tournament
Big 12 Conference Baseball Tournament
Big 12 Conference baseball tournament
Big 12 Conference baseball tournament
Baseball competitions in Oklahoma City
College sports tournaments in Oklahoma